Mamballi  is a village in the southern state of Karnataka, India. It is located in the Yelandur taluk of Chamarajanagar district.

Demographics
 India census, Mamballi had a population of 6250 with 3086 males and 3164 females.

See also
 Chamarajanagar
 Districts of Karnataka

References

External links
 http://Chamarajanagar.nic.in/

Villages in Chamarajanagar district